Sermitsiaq Glacier is a tidewater glacier in the Qeqqata municipality in western Greenland. It drains Maniitsoq ice cap into two fjords flowing towards Davis Strait: Kangaamiut Kangerluarsuat Fjord in the north, and the longer Kangerlussuatsiaq Fjord in the south.

See also
List of glaciers in Greenland

References

External links

Glaciers of Greenland